John Ditchburn is an Australian cartoonist who has contributed to the Ballarat Courier, Eureka Street, the Independent Monthly, Border Mail, and the Australasian Post.

References
 Inkcinct cartoons Australia (electronic resource) / John Ditchburn

Australian editorial cartoonists
Living people
Year of birth missing (living people)
Place of birth missing (living people)